unifi Sports (formerly HyppSports HD) is an in-house subscription IPTV network in Malaysia dedicated to broadcasting sports-related content 24 hours a day. It is available exclusively on unifi TV.

History 
Launched in 2012 as one of unifi TV original channels, HyppSports Illustrated HD (a joint-venture between unifi TV and Sports Illustrated Asia) offers a sports of international sporting events such as football, badminton, motorsport, rugby, volleyball and golf. unifi TV also operates two sister channels, HyppSports Illustrated 2 HD and HyppSports 3 HD on channels 702 & 703 respectively, along with a high definition simulcast of all channels.

The network was eventually closed in 2019 but after TM regain broadcasting rights of the top Malaysian football competitions/tournaments, a year later, unifi TV relaunch the sports network with its new name, unifi Sports.

Current rights

Mixed martial arts 
 Ultimate Fighting Championship

Motorsports 
 Malaysia Speed Festival
 MSF SuperMoto
 MSF SuperTurismo

Former rights

Soccer 
 FAM (until 2023)
 Malaysia FA Cup
 MFL
 Malaysia Cup
 Malaysia Super League
 Piala Sumbangsih
 Malaysia Premier League (until 2022)
 AFF
 AFF Championship

Motorsports 
 Malaysia Superbike Championship

Sister names 
 DEGUP
 Dunia Sinema
 Inspirasi
 Salam HD
 Sensasi

Broadcast platform 
 Malaysia: unifi TV

External links 
 
Television channels and stations established in 2020

References 

Sports television in Malaysia
Astro Malaysia Holdings television channels